Lyne Renée (born Line Van Wambeke; 17 May 1979) is a Belgian actress.

She graduated from the Studio Herman Teirlinck in Antwerp, Belgium. From 2003 to 2005 she appeared as stage actress in Belgian theaters. After she starred in the Belgian TV series Kinderen van Dewindt and the Dutch movie Ober by Alex van Warmerdam. In 2006 she moved to Los Angeles and appeared in the movies The Box Collector (2008) and The Hessen Conspiracy (2009). The latter is a film noir the plot of which takes place in the US-occupied Germany right after the end of World War II. In it Renée plays a femme fatale, who is the driving force behind a jewelry heist.

In 2011 she moved to London, where she starred in The River Line at the Jermyn Street Theatre. She also appeared in the TV series Strike Back and Parade's End.

In 2016, she had a recurring role on the ABC series Of Kings and Prophets as the Witch of Endor, appeared in the miniseries Madoff as Catherine Hooper, fiancée of Andrew Madoff, and had a role in the thriller Split.

In 2017 she appeared in the second season of the PBS series Mercy Street as well as the film The Hippopotamus.

Filmography

Film

Television

Notes

External links
 
 Interview with Lyne Renée (Video, Dutch)

1979 births
Living people
People from Zottegem
Belgian stage actresses
Belgian television actresses
Belgian film actresses